The 2008 women's road cycling season was the fourth season for the 2008 UCI Women's Cycling Team: AA-Drink Cycling Team (UCI code: AAD), which began as Van Bemmelen–AA Drink in 2005.

Roster
 Marlijn Binnendijk (The Netherlands) 12-05-1986  
 Chantal Blaak (The Netherlands) 22-10-1989  
 Latoya Brulee (Belgium) 09-12-1988  
 Paulina Brzeźna-Bentkowska (Poland) 10-09-1981  
 Maxime Groenewegen (The Netherlands) 14-07-1988  
 Ludivine Henrion (Belgium) 23-01-1984  
 Emma Johansson (Sweden) 23-09-1983  
 Gabrielle Rovers (The Netherlands) 21-11-1976  
 Theresa Senff (Germany) 02-02-1982  
 Inge van den Broeck (Belgium) 21-03-1978 
 Irene van den Broek (The Netherlands) 26-08-1980 
 Laure Werner (Belgium) 22-02-1981  
 Kirsten Wild (The Netherlands) 15-10-1982 
Source:

Results

Season victories

Results in major races

Women's World Cup 2008

Other achievements

Dutch national records, team pursuit 

The women's 3000 m team pursuit track cycling discipline was introduced at the 2007–08 track cycling season. The Dutch team including Ellen van Dijk and Yvonne Hijgenaar rode the team pursuit for the first time at Round 4 at the 2007–08 UCI Track Cycling World Cup in Copenhagen in a time of 3:36.901 (49.792 km/h). They broke the record later that day. At the 2008 UCI Track Cycling World Championships the Dutch team including Van Dijk broke the record again in the qualifying round. This is not the current record anymore.

References

2008 UCI Women's Teams seasons
2008 in Dutch sport
AA Drink–leontien.nl